Les Fallowfield (12 March 1914 – 29 May 1999) was an Australian cricketer. He played eleven first-class matches for New South Wales between 1934/35 and 1941/42.

See also
 List of New South Wales representative cricketers

References

External links
 

1914 births
1999 deaths
Australian cricketers
New South Wales cricketers
Cricketers from Sydney